40S ribosomal protein S29 is a protein that in humans is encoded by the RPS29 gene.

Function 

Ribosomes, the organelles that catalyze protein synthesis, consist of a small 40S subunit and a large 60S subunit. Together these subunits are composed of 4 RNA species and approximately 80 structurally distinct proteins. This gene encodes a ribosomal protein that is a component of the 40S subunit and a member of the S14P family of ribosomal proteins. The protein, which contains a C2-C2 zinc finger-like domain that can bind to zinc, can enhance the tumor suppressor activity of Ras-related protein 1A (KREV1). It is located in the cytoplasm. Variable expression of this gene in colorectal cancers compared to adjacent normal tissues has been observed, although no correlation between the level of expression and the severity of the disease has been found. As is typical for genes encoding ribosomal proteins, there are multiple processed pseudogenes of this gene dispersed through the genome.

Clinical significance 

Mutations in RPS29 cause Diamond–Blackfan anemia.

References

Further reading 

 
 
 
 
 
 
 
 
 

Ribosomal proteins